Sultan Haji Omar 'Ali Saifuddien Bridge, also known as Temburong Bridge, is a dual-carriageway bridge in Brunei that spans across Brunei Bay, connecting the Bruneian mainland with its semi-exclave of Temburong.

Construction 
The construction of the bridge was divided into six 'packages' or contracts. The first was CC1 or the Mentiri Tunnels which involved the construction of a series of tunnels through the Mentiri Ridges which connects Jalan Utama Mentiri, a controlled-access dual carriageway, with Jalan Kota Batu. Other construction packages included CC2, CC3 and CC4 comprising Marine Viaducts, Navigation Bridges and Temburong Viaduct respectively. CC2 and CC3 were awarded to Daelim, a South Korean company, which was responsible for constructing a system of viaducts and two cable-stayed bridges that crosses the Brunei Bay. Meanwhile, China State Construction Engineering was awarded the CC4 contract and was responsible for constructing the land viaduct which traverses the mangrove swamp of Labu Forest Reserve. CC5A and CC5B are the traffic control and survelliance system, and power supply system respectively. The project is reported to cost 1.6 billion Brunei dollars (US$1.2 billion as of March 2018).

Construction on the bridge started in 2014 and was expected to be completed and opened by the end of 2019, but it ultimately opened during March 2020. Due to the COVID-19 pandemic, the bridge was opened ahead of schedule on 17 March 2020, a day after Brunei barred most non-resident foreigners from entering the country, and most citizens and residents from leaving, which would have otherwise disconnected Temburong from the rest of the country.

On 14 July 2020, on the occasion of Sultan Haji Hassanal Bolkiah's 74th birthday, the bridge was named the Sultan Haji Omar 'Ali Saifuddien Bridge in honor of the Sultan's late father, Sultan Haji Omar 'Ali Saifuddien Saadul Khairi Waddien, who is widely regarded as the architect of modern Brunei.

Route 
The road system is a controlled-access dual carriageway which begins at a grade-separated interchange with Jalan Utama Mentiri between the Sungai Akar roundabout and the Salambigar intersection. The road then goes through two parallel tunnels and ends at another grade-separated interchange with Jalan Kota Batu. The bridge then begins, with a  viaduct across the Brunei Bay, passing across the tip of Pulau Berambang, then in between Pulau Pepatan and Pulau Baru-Baru, up to Tanjung Kulat in Temburong. Finally, another  viaduct begins from Tanjung Kulat and ends at Jalan Labu, traversing through Labu Forest Reserve, and includes a bridge which crosses the Labu River, before intersecting with Jalan Labu at a roundabout.

It connects Mengkubau and Sungai Besar in Brunei-Muara District with Labu Estate in Temburong District. This is the only road bridge in the country that directly links the mainland with the Temburong exclave, which are physically separated by the Sarawakian district of Limbang in Malaysia and Brunei Bay in the South China Sea. The bridge allows commuters to travel between the two territories without having to go through Malaysia, bypassing four immigration checkpoints along the mainland route and shortening travel times between Temburong and the capital Bandar Seri Begawan. Previously, the only direct connection between the capital and Bangar, the district town, was via water taxi services, which took about 45 minutes.

Junction list

References

External links 
Public Works Department portal

Bridges in Brunei